Pongini is a tribe containing the orangutan and the fossil genus Khoratpithecus.

References 

Apes
Mammal tribes